He Who Can't Marry is a 2009 South Korean television series starring Ji Jin-hee, Uhm Jung-hwa, Kim So-eun, Yoo Ah-in and Yang Jung-a. A romantic comedy about an extremely stubborn and inflexible 40-year-old bachelor, it is a remake of the 2006 Japanese drama Kekkon Dekinai Otoko.

Plot
Architect Jae-hee (Ji Jin-hee) has the looks and the money, but he's over forty and still a bachelor. Despite being great marriage material on paper, his blunt personality and precise lifestyle turn women off. Jae-hee just can't seem to get married—until he meets his equal, single 40-year-old doctor Moon-jung (Uhm Jung-hwa), who spends most of her time at work doing overtime and covering for colleagues. Romance may be in the air yet for the unmarriageable Jae-hee, but there's also his longtime colleague Ki-ran (Yang Jung-a) and young neighbor Yoo-jin (Kim So-eun) to consider.

Cast
Ji Jin-hee as Jo Jae-hee
A forty-year-old bachelor & Moon-jung's patient.

Uhm Jung-hwa as Jang Moon-jung
A single doctor in her forties.

Kim So-eun as Jeong Yoo-jin
Jae-hee's next door neighbor who has a dog named Sangu.

Yoo Ah-in as Park Hyun-kyu
He works for Jae-hee and is interested in Yoo-jin.

Yang Jung-a as Yoon Ki-ran
Jae-hee's partner in the firm.

Im Ho as Park Kwang-nam
Jae-hee's brother-in-law.

Kim Byung-ki as Jang Bong-soo
A dentist and Moon-jung's father.

Yoo Tae-woong as Moon Seok-hwan
Jae-hee's most hated person.

Bae Min-hee as Jo Yoon-hee
Kwang-nam's wife & Jae-hee's sister.

Jeon Yang-ja as Kang Hye-ja
Jae-hee's mother.

Jang Dan-ji as Kim Yeon-soo
Moon-jung's assistant/nurse.

Choi Yoon-young as Yoo Soo-young
Yoo-jin's friend.

Jang Jung-hee as Jo Yeong-shil, Bong-soo's dental assistant
Lee Dal-hyung as foreman
Seo Jun-young as Kim Tae-yeol, Yoo-jin's ex-boyfriend
Kim Hye-mi as Tae-yeong, Moon-jung's assistant nurse
Danji as Eun-hee, Moon-jung's assistant nurse
Kim Yu-bin as rental shop clerk
Sung Eun-chae as convenience store clerk
Choi Sun-young as Park Ye-won, daughter of Kwang-nam & Yoon-hee
Shin Pyo as stalker
Kim Gun-mo as blind date guy (cameo, episode 1&8)
Lee Jung-sub as fashion designer Matthew Jung (cameo, episode 1)
Wink as singer (cameo, episode 1)
Kwak Hyun-hwa as Mattew's wife (cameo, episode 1)
Jeon Hye-bin as Lee Hwa-ran (cameo, episode 3, 6~8)

Awards and nominations

References

External links
 He Who Can't Marry official KBS website 
 
 
 

Korean Broadcasting System television dramas
2009 South Korean television series debuts
2009 South Korean television series endings
South Korean romantic comedy television series
South Korean television series based on Japanese television series
Kekkon Dekinai Otoko